Frances Burke may refer to:

Frances Burke, Countess of Clanricarde (1567–1633), English noblewoman
Frances Marie Burke (1922–2017), Miss America 1940
Frances Mary Burke (1904–1994) was an Australian artist

See also
Francis Burke (disambiguation)
France Burke (born c. 1926), American poet and daughter of Kenneth Burke